Scopula subdecorata is a moth of the  family Geometridae. It is found on Borneo.

Scopula subdecorata is the montane sister-species of Scopula vacuata.

References

Moths described in 1896
subdecorata
Moths of Asia